J. Chandulal Jain was a popular Kannada film director and Producer of almost 40 films, notably, Thaaye Devaru, Bhootayyana Maga Ayyu, Tabbaliyu Neenade Magane, Bhakta Siriyala, and many more. He also produced movies in Hindi such as Godhuli and Pyaar Karke Dekho. His film Idu Saadhya was shot in just 48 hours.

This filmmaker won a national award for Tabbaliyu Neenade Magane and three Government of Karnataka awards for films Bhootayaana Maga Ayyu, Veerappan, and Gangamma Gangamaayi. He also won the state government's Lifetime Achievement Award and Kannada Rajyotsava for his contributions to the Kannada film industry.

He was instrumental in introducing Kamal Haasan and Rajinikanth to the Kannada film industry.

Personal details

His family originates from Padiv, a town in Rajasthan, and he migrated to Chennai during the 1970s. He married Leela and were blessed with two daughters and two sons: Rajakumar and Rohit. He initially started out as a cloth merchant and through close contacts he was able to get in touch with a lot of renowned film personalities - actors and producers - while working in the Davanagere district of Karnataka.

He used to supply imported perfumes and other material to Rajkumar, Kannada thespian. According to Rohit Jain, son of Chandulal, Rajkumar was impressed with Chandulal's fluency in Kannada and encouraged him to produce films in the language. Varadappa, brother of Rajkumar, having become close friend of Chandulal arranged a call sheet of the actors; consequently, Chandulal produced Rajkumar's hit movie Thaayi Devaru.

He died at the age of 75 on 17 December 2009 in Bangalore due to prolonged illness after undergoing several surgeries. He is survived by his wife and all four children.

Filmography

He produced almost 40 films; 35 were in Kannada language as a producer. He was the producer of Thaayi Devaru, in which Rajkumar was a lead actor, and the film was a huge success. He produced 'Tabbaliyu Neenade Magane and Gangavva Gangamaayi, which were financial failures but won critics applause. His three films – Bhootayaana Maga Ayyu, Veerappan, and Gangamma Gangamaayi – won the best film awards from the Karnataka Government.

His Thabbaliyu Neenaade Magane, based on the popular novel by S. L. Byrappa, won the national award for Best Feature Film in Kannada in 1977, which he shared with another co-producer B.M. Venkatesh.

He produced few Hindi movies such as Godhuli starring Naseeruddin Shah and Om Puri; Godhuli won the national Filmfare Awards, which he produced simultaneously with Thabbaliyu Neenaade Magane. Pyaar Karke Dekho with Govinda as a lead actor was another Hindi movie with him as an executive producer.

His last Kannada movie was Bahala Channagide starring Shiv Rajkumar as a hero, while other popular movies were Hemavathi, Praya Praya Praya, Bettele Seve, Jari Bidda Jana, Bhakta Siriyala, Sangrama, Yuddakanda, Yediyur Siddalingeshwara. Bhakta Siriyala was a blockbluster. His Idu Sadhya was shot in a record 48 hours.

He directed a few movies like Jaari Bidda Jaana with Jayanti, Ashok, and Lokesh as cast crew, and produced by Y.R. Swamy. Benkiyalli Aralida Hoovu, a remake of Tamil movie Aval Oru Thodar Kathai, was produced by Chandulal Jain in Kannada language and directed by K. Balachander, won Filmfare Awards to actress Suhasini for her performance.

Kannada
Thayi Devaru (1971)
Bhootayyana Maga Ayyu (1974)
Tabbaliyu Neenade Magane (1977)
Bhakta Siriyala (1980)
Veerappan
Gangavva Gangamaayi
Hemavathi
Jaari Bidda Jaana (1980)
Praya Praya Praya (1981)
Bettele Seve (1982)
Sangrama
Yuddakanda
Benkiyalli Aralida Hoovu (1983)
Yediyur Siddalingeshwara
Idu Saadhya (1989)
Bahala Chennagide (2001)

Hindi
Godhuli (1977)
Pyaar Karke Dekho (1987)

Awards
 Kannada Rajyotsava Award
 Lifetime Achievement Award from Karnataka state government in 2004–2005
Karnataka State Film Awards
 1973-74
First Best Film:Boothayyana Maga Ayyu
 1991-92
First Best Film:Veerappan
 1994-95
First Best Film:Gangavva Gangamaayi

National Film Awards
 1977
Best Kannada Film:Thabbaliyu Neenaade Magane

Filmfare Award for Best Film – Kannada for Tabbaliyu Neenade Magane in 1977

See also
 National Film Award for Best Feature Film in Kannada
 S. L. Bhyrappa#Movies

References

External links
 
 
 

2009 deaths
Artists from Rajasthan
Film directors from Bangalore
Film producers from Bangalore
Kannada film producers
Kannada film directors
Hindi film producers
Year of birth missing
Recipients of the Rajyotsava Award 2003
20th-century Indian Jains